Twist the Truth is the fourth album by Norwegian musician Lene Marlin. It was released on 30 March 2009. "Here We Are" was released as the first single from the album.

Marlin began work on the album with Even "Magnet" Johansen in late spring 2008. In July 2008, several Norwegian webpages announced that she was in the studio recording her fourth album.

According to an article in Dagbladet, 16 April 2009, Twist the Truth has sold 17,000 copies since being released.
The album was certified gold in Norway and was confirmed by Lene on her official Myspace page.

The first single, "Here We Are", has secured Lene's comeback by remaining on the premier spot on the Norwegian National Radio Chart for two weeks.
For the first time since 2003, Lene has a No. 1 hit on the radio in Norway.

Track listing

Charts

Certifications

References

External links
Lene Marlin Official Website

2009 albums
Lene Marlin albums
Folk albums by Norwegian artists